Elizabeth Hills may refer to:

 Elizabeth Hills, New South Wales, a suburb of Sydney, Australia
 Liz Hills (born 1954), American rower